Maganjo is a settlement in Kenya's Central Province.It is located in Murang'a District, approximately 59 km from Kenya's capital Nairobi (Nairobi).

Maganjo is known for its coffee planting activities, a fine coffee which made the area to be known as 
“home of Kenyan coffee".

References 

https://www.hikofi.eu/en/izdelek/kava-kenya-maganjo/

Populated places in Central Province (Kenya)